O Tico-Tico was a weekly Brazilian children's magazine, published between 1905 and 1977. It was the first magazine to publish comics in Brazil. It also featured stories and educational activities. Among its famous readers were Erico Verissimo, Lygia Fagundes Telles, Ruy Barbosa and Carlos Drummond de Andrade.

History and profile
O Tico Tico was founded by journalist Luis Bartolomeu de Souza e Silva, inspired by foreign magazines such as the French La Semaine de Suzette. The date of its first issue was October 11, 1905. Luis Bartolomeu de Souza e Silva also launched a satirical magazine, O Malho. O Tico Tico was published by the O Malho group.

The magazine published comics by Brazilian artists such as  Reco-Reco, Bolão e Azeitona, by Luis Sá and Lamparina, by J. Carlos and foreign comics, such as Richard Outcault's Buster Brown, (known as Chiquinho in Brazil; its stories were loosely adapted by Brazilian writers), Popeye, Felix the Cat  and Mickey Mouse (then known as Ratinho Curioso — "Curious Mouse").

The magazine declined after the 1930s, with the competition of other comics magazines, such as Suplemento Juvenil and O Gibi. It stopped circulating in 1957, only with special editions being released until 1977, when O Tico-Tico ceased to exist.

References

External links

Digitalized issues of O Tico-Tico on the Hemeroteca Digital Brasileira (Brazilian National Library periodical archives)
Digitalized issues of Almanaque O Tico-Tico on the Hemeroteca Digital Brasileira (Brazilian National Library periodical archives)

1905 comics debuts
1977 comics endings
1905 establishments in Brazil
1977 disestablishments in Brazil
Comics magazines published in Brazil
Children's magazines
Defunct magazines published in Brazil
Magazines established in 1905
Magazines disestablished in 1977
Portuguese-language magazines
Weekly magazines published in Brazil